Horror films released in the 1980s are listed in the following articles:
 List of horror films of 1980
 List of horror films of 1981
 List of horror films of 1982
 List of horror films of 1983
 List of horror films of 1984
 List of horror films of 1985
 List of horror films of 1986
 List of horror films of 1987
 List of horror films of 1988
 List of horror films of 1989

1980s
Lists of 1980s films by genre